William C. Armstrong (born May 18, 1970) is a Canadian former professional ice hockey defenceman currently working as general manager of the Arizona Coyotes of the National Hockey League (NHL).

Career 
Armstrong played nine seasons in the American Hockey League (AHL) and the International Hockey League (IHL) and served as head coach for the AHL's Providence Bruins and ECHL's Trenton Titans, both for two seasons. He was previously the St. Louis Blues' assistant general manager and director of amateur scouting.

Career statistics

References

External links
 

1970 births
Arizona Coyotes executives
Canadian ice hockey defencemen
Cleveland Lumberjacks players
Hamilton Dukes players
Hershey Bears players
Ice hockey people from Ontario
Living people
National Hockey League general managers
Niagara Falls Thunder players
Oshawa Generals players
Philadelphia Flyers draft picks
Providence Bruins players
Sportspeople from Richmond Hill, Ontario
St. Louis Blues executives
Toronto Marlboros players